Boma, is a town in South Sudan.

Location
Boma is located in Pibor County, Pibor Administrative Area, in eastern South Sudan, near the border with Ethiopia.

Overview
Boma was the first town captured by the Sudan People's Liberation Army at the beginning of its insurgency in 1983. The SPLA subsequently used the town's name for the lowest-level administrative division in the territory it controlled, which continues in modern-day South Sudan.

More recently, the town of Boma has been at the center of the insurgency of the South Sudan Democratic Army led by David Yau Yau.

Transport
A road connects Boma to Raad along the border of Ethiopia. Another road leads southwest out of Boma, through the park via Kassangor to the town of Kapoeta . The town is also served by Boma Airstrip.

Population

Points of interest
Boma National Park, the largest national park in South Sudan, lies to the west of Boma.

References

 

Populated places in Jonglei State